Archives is a Washington Metro station in Washington, D.C. on the Green and Yellow Lines.

The station is located in Northwest Washington at 7th Street between Pennsylvania and Indiana Avenues, and it is very close to Gallery Place station, so close that the lights of one station can be seen down the tunnel from the other. It takes its name from the nearby National Archives. Its subtitle is derived from the U.S. Navy Memorial and the Penn Quarter neighborhood in which the station is located. It is a popular stop for tourists, with easy access to the northern side of the National Mall.

History
Service began on April 30, 1983.

The station was originally named Archives–Navy Memorial. In 2004, it was renamed Archives–Navy Memorial–Penn Quarter, in recognition of the nearby Penn Quarter neighborhood. "Navy Memorial" and "Penn Quarter" were moved to a new subtitle, leaving "Archives" as the main name, on November 3, 2011. New signage was installed accordingly in 2005, following the 2004 renaming, and in late-spring 2012, following the late-2011 second renaming.

There is a provision for a future second mezzanine at the south end of the station, with a knock-out panel visible on the station's south wall.

From March 26, 2020, until June 28, 2020, this station was closed due to the COVID-19 pandemic.

Between January 15 to January 21, 2021, this station was closed because of security concerns due to the 2020 Inauguration.

From October 12, 2021, to October 14, 2021, Blue Line Trains temporarily served this station due to a Blue Line Train derailment near the Pentagon Station.

Station layout

The station has an island platform accessed from the corner of Indiana Avenue and Seventh Street, NW.

Notable places nearby 

 Department of Justice
 Embassy of Canada, Washington, D.C.
 Federal Trade Commission
 Ford's Theatre
 Grand Army of the Republic Memorial
 J. Edgar Hoover Building (headquarters of the FBI)
 National Archives
 National Gallery of Art
 National Mall
 National Museum of Natural History
 Newseum
 Temperance Fountain

In popular culture 
In 2004, the station was referenced in the Disney film National Treasure. The station entrance was also featured in the 2007 film Breach.

References

External links
 

 The Schumin Web Transit Center: Archives Station
 Pennsylvania Avenue entrance from Google Maps Street View

Stations on the Green Line (Washington Metro)
Washington Metro stations in Washington, D.C.
Stations on the Yellow Line (Washington Metro)
Railway stations located underground in Washington, D.C.
Railway stations in the United States opened in 1983